Wild Animal is the 1984 debut studio album by Canadian singer Vanity. Released by Motown Records in November 1984, the album yielded two hit singles on the US R&B Songs chart, with "Pretty Mess" and "Mechanical Emotion". The album's third single, "Samuelle" scored minor radio play but failed to chart on either Hot 100 or R&B singles.

Critical reception 

In a contemporary review for The Village Voice, Robert Christgau gave Wild Animal a "C−" and compared the record to Vanity 6: "Where formerly she talked her way through bright, crisp, rocking high-end arrangements and kept the smut simple, here she "sings" verbose, amelodic fantasies rendered even duller by a dim, bassy mix. And anyone who dreamed that she'd liberated herself from pornographic role-playing should get a load of the electric dildos, cum-stained frocks, and psychedelic sex slavery she flaunts as she strikes out on her own.
AllMusic editor Alex Henderson was somewhat more enthusiastic in a retrospective review, giving the album three out of five stars while writing, "Wild Animal is essentially an R&B album, but Vanity laces her R&B with big doses of rock and pop. Despite her obvious limitations as a vocalist, Wild Animal is a respectable solo debut. But the public refused to take Vanity seriously as a solo artist, and this album's unimpressive sales reflected that." The 4th track "Strap On Robbie Baby" was notable for being on    Filthy Fifteen List from the PRMC, for songs Tipper Gore found offensive , and used in the USA to start the Parental Advisory warning labels on music.

Track listing 
All songs published by Jobete Music Co., Inc. & Wolftoons Music (ASCAP). All lyrics and melodies composed by Vanity. All music composed, performed, and arranged by Bill Wolfer, except † lyrics composed by Robert Bruce McCan (Vanity's former boyfriend at that time).

Personnel 
 Vanity – lead vocals, backing vocals, vocal arrangements
 Bill Wolfer – keyboards, drum programming, synthesizers
 David Williams – rhythm guitar on "Wild Animal"
 Ed Sanders – recording, mixing, additional vocals on "Flippin' Out"
 Robbie Bruce – male vocals on "Strap On 'Robbie Baby'"
 Julian Jackson – male vocals on "Crazy Maybe"
 Morris Day – male vocals on "Mechanical Emotion"
Technical
 Allen Zentz – mastering
 Daniel Poulin – photography
 The Buck – executive producer
 Bill Wolfer – producer, arranger

Charts

Weekly charts 

 "Wild Animal" spent 25 weeks on the R&B Albums chart.

Singles

References 

Vanity (singer) albums
1984 debut albums
Motown albums